John Thomas Phillips (born February 6, 1947) is a former college basketball coach and current head high school basketball coach for Summit Christian Academy. Phillips was hired as the head coach at the University of Tulsa after Buzz Peterson left to take the head coaching position with the Tennessee Volunteers.

Assistant coaching career
Phillips started his assistant coaching career under Eddie Sutton at Oklahoma State, where he coached for two years.  Bill Self brought him onto his staff at Tulsa in his first season, and Phillips remained after Self left for the University of Illinois.  He helped coach Tulsa to a win in the 2001 National Invitation Tournament before being promoted to head coach.

Head coaching career

Head coaching record

Personal life
John Phillips also coached high school sports for 16 years, most notably at Broken Arrow High School, where he coached in between his assistant coach roles at Oklahoma State and Tulsa and won a state championship.  Oklahoma State Senate Resolution 18 commends Phillips for his performance in leading Broken Arrow to the state championship and his previous postseason runs as a high school coach.

References

1947 births
Living people
Basketball coaches from Oklahoma
High school basketball coaches in the United States
Junior college men's basketball players in the United States
Oklahoma State Cowboys basketball coaches
Oklahoma State University alumni
Sportspeople from Tulsa, Oklahoma
Tulsa Golden Hurricane men's basketball coaches
University of Tulsa alumni